Levi Strauss (born Löb Strauß, ; February 26, 1829 – September 26, 1902) was a German-born American businessman who founded the first company to manufacture blue jeans. His firm of Levi Strauss & Co. (Levi's) began in 1853 in San Francisco, California.

Early life

Levi Strauss was born in an Ashkenazi Jewish family in Buttenheim on February 26, 1829, in the Franconia region of the Kingdom of Bavaria in the German Confederation. He was the son of Hirsch Strauss and his second wife Rebecca Strauss (née Haas).

In 1847, aged 18, Strauss travelled with his mother and two sisters to the United States to join his brothers Jonas and Louis, who had begun a wholesale dry goods business in New York City called J. Strauss Brother & Co., at 108 Liberty Street in Manhattan. After arriving in New York, Strauss worked as an itinerant peddler of goods from his brother's store: kettles, blankets and sewing goods.

Business career
Levi's sister Fanny and her husband David Stern moved to St. Louis, Missouri, while Levi went to live in Louisville, Kentucky, and sold his brothers' supplies there. Levi became an American citizen in January 1853.

The family decided to open a West Coast branch of their dry goods business in San Francisco, which was the commercial hub of the California Gold Rush. Levi was chosen to represent them, and he took a steamship for San Francisco, where he arrived in early March 1854 and joined his sister's family.

Strauss opened his wholesale business as Levi Strauss & Co. and imported fine dry goods from his brothers in New York, including clothing, bedding, combs, purses, and handkerchiefs. He made tents and later jeans while he lived with Fanny's growing family. Jacob W. Davis was one of his customers and the inventor of riveted denim pants, and in 1871, he went into business with Strauss to produce blue jeans. The two men patented the new style of work pants in 1873.

Death
Levi Strauss died on September 26, 1902, and was buried in the Home of Peace Cemetery in Colma, California. He left his company to his four nephews, Jacob, Sigmund, Louis, and Abraham Stern, the sons of his sister Fanny and her husband David Stern. His estate was worth about $6 million (equivalent to $ in ). Sigmund's only child, Elise, married Walter A. Haas, the son of Abraham Haas, whose descendants are the current owners of Levi Strauss & Co.

Legacy
Levi Strauss, a member of the Reform branch of Judaism, helped establish Congregation Emanu-El, the first Jewish synagogue in the city of San Francisco. He also gave money to several charities, including special funds for orphans.  The Levi Strauss Foundation started with an 1897 donation to the University of California, Berkeley, that provided the funds for 28 scholarships.

The Levi Strauss museum is located in the 1687 house where Strauss was born Buttenheim, Germany. There is also a visitors center at Levi Strauss & Co. headquarters in San Francisco, which features historical exhibits.

In 1994, he was inducted into the Hall of Great Westerners of the National Cowboy & Western Heritage Museum.

References

External links

 Biography of Levi Strauss from the Official Levi Strauss Site.
 
 Levi Strauss Museum in Buttenheim, Germany 

1829 births
1902 deaths
19th-century American businesspeople
19th-century American inventors
American businesspeople in retailing
American company founders
American people of German-Jewish descent
American manufacturing businesspeople
Businesspeople from San Francisco
Businesspeople from New York City
German Ashkenazi Jews
German emigrants to the United States
People from Bamberg (district)
People of the California Gold Rush
Brand founders
Jeans
Manufacturing company founders
Retail company founders
 
Burials at Home of Peace Cemetery (Colma, California)